Isenburg-Birstein was the name of two German historical states centred on Birstein in southeastern Hesse, Germany. The first "Isenburg-Birstein" was a County and was created as a partition of Isenburg-Büdingen-Birstein in 1628. It was merged into Isenburg-Offenbach in 1664. The second "Isenburg-Birstein" was a Principality, created as a partition of Isenburg-Offenbach in 1711. It was renamed the "Principality of Isenburg" in 1806.

Counts and Princes of Isenburg-Birstein

Counties of the Holy Roman Empire
House of Isenburg
States and territories established in 1711
States and territories established in 1628
1628 establishments in the Holy Roman Empire
Principalities of the Holy Roman Empire
Former monarchies of Europe